Yerlibahçe is a village in the Siirt District of Siirt Province in Turkey. The village had a population of 99 in 2021.

History 
The village was part of the Chaldean Catholic Eparchy of Seert of the Chaldean Catholic Church and had a population of 326 Assyrians in 1913.

References 

Villages in Siirt District
Kurdish settlements in Siirt Province
Historic Assyrian communities in Turkey